Track spikes, or just spikes, are a type of footwear featuring protruding spikes on the soles used by athletes when racing on the track. Some spikes are designed for longer-term training on tracks, but generally the shoes are used for racing. The term "spikes" can also refer to track shoes featuring such protrusions, though these are technically called pins. Spikes are similar to studs, which are used for team sports, although generally smaller and with a sharp point.

History

Track spikes had become popular in England by the 1860s, but the concept of spikes in shoes to give running traction has been around much longer. As written in the 1852 publication of Calmet's Dictionary of the Holy Bible regarding military arms at the time of Paul the Apostle (c. 5 – c. 67):

For pioneering the use of spikes, J.W. Foster and Sons's revolutionary running pumps appear in the book, Golden Kicks: The Shoes that changed Sport. The company began distributing shoes across the United Kingdom and were worn by British athletes. They were made famous by 100m Olympic champion Harold Abrahams (who would be immortalized in the Oscar winning film Chariots of Fire) in the 1924 Summer Olympics held in Paris.

In 1934, American football player and coach Pop Warner recommended them for running events in his widely distributed book, "Pop" Warner's book for boys.

Additionally, Adolf Dassler, the founder of Adidas, assisted in the development of track spikes for multiple events. In an effort to enhance the quality of spiked athletic footwear, he transitioned from a previous model of heavy metal spikes to attempting to utilize canvas and rubber. He carved them by hand and were eventually worn during the 1936 Olympics by Jesse Owens. People began to take notice, and Owens inherently helped popularize Dassler's design. Track spikes continued to gain notable recognition when Emil Zátopek, a distance runner from Czech Republic, wore them during the 1952 Olympics in Helsinki.

Design 

The front of the sole features a rigid or semi-rigid spike plate containing between 3 and 9 threaded holes called spike wells. Spikes can be screwed into each well using a spike wrench. Recently, some individuals have attempted to add a "through hole" at the bottom of the spike to make them easier to tighten, remove, and install.

Some shoes have permanent or "fixed" spikes which are not meant to be removed. Spikes may break during competition.

Track shoes are exceptionally light, some shoes weighing less than five ounces (142 grams) each, half the weight of many standard running shoes.

In most track shoes, the toe region bends up to allow space for protruding spikes and to encourage athletes to run on their toes. This upward angle, known as "taper," varies widely depending on the intended use of the shoe, and the taper angle can be rigid or flexible. Shoes with a large taper are said to be "aggressive."

This shoe design may cause harm to the athlete if worn for extended periods of time outside of competition. Injury may occur when walking in a leisurely fashion, as the athlete is not on his or her toes, which is the manner in which the shoes were meant to be worn.

Types of shoes 

There is considerable variation among track shoes depending on their intended use within the sport of track and field.

Sprint spikes generally have a very stiff spike plate with the greatest number of spike wells. The taper is highest and most rigid in sprint spikes, maximizing the efficiency of energy transfer with each stride. Very little heel support is needed because sprinters spend most or all of their time on their toes. Sprint spikes may have a zip-up cover instead of or in addition to laces to improve aerodynamics. Sprint spikes should fit tightly but they should not be too tight to the point that the runners toes are cramping and they should not be too loose that will result in the runner losing power and speed. They should fit tighter than regular athletic shoes yet still comfortable enough to perform in.

Distance shoes have a more flexible spike plate with less taper and fewer spikes. Because of the longer race distances, support through the mid-foot and heel is as important as efficiency with distance spikes. This means that distance spikes generally have a softer, more durable sole, particularly through the heel region. Although still "glove-like," the fit for distance spikes is generally slightly looser than for sprint spikes, given the longer race duration.

Middle distance spikes are a hybrid of a sprint shoe and a distance shoe, featuring an intermediate level of taper, spike plate rigidity, cushioning and support. Certain middle distance spikes are also popular among hurdlers because they have a relatively steep taper for sprinting and a cushioned heel for landings.

Cross country spikes usually have no more than six spike points and are similar to distance spikes in many respects. However, given the wide range of terrain encountered off-track, cross country spikes have a more durable rubber sole and supportive mid-foot to provide a level of cushioning and stabilization not required on a track. Depending on race length, surface types and personal preference, cross country spikes may be abandoned in favor of racing flats.

Shoes for field events and specialty events vary widely depending upon the specific requirements of each event. For example, long jump shoes are most similar to sprint spikes to provide good top speed, high jump shoes have flat bottoms and heel spikes to allow energy transfer through the entire foot, and steeplechase shoes are predominantly a water-resistant mesh for exceptional ventilation. While shoes for shot put, discus and hammer throw have flat rubber soles with no spikes, they may still occasionally be referred to as "track spikes."

Notable spike manufacturers include Adidas, Asics, Brooks, Mizuno, New Balance, Nike, Puma AG, Reebok and Saucony.

Types of spikes 

While most spikes are between 3/16 inch (5 mm) and 1/2 inch (12 mm) long, the most common is 1/4 inch (6 mm). Additionally, there are various specialty lengths, as well as minimal "blank" spikes (also called studs) used to cover a spike well. Spikes are generally metal or ceramic and come in three main types: the pyramid, the needle (pin), and the compression tier (Christmas tree). Pyramids are conical spikes that taper to a sharp point. They normally have a maximum diameter nearly equal to the diameter of the threads of the spike. Needles also have a sharp point, but a thinner cone diameter. Track spikes create traction by penetrating the track surface. Some tracks do not allow pin spikes and limit the length of pyramid spikes to minimize damage to the track. A variation for synthetic tracks is the Christmas Tree spike. It uses a terraced cone shape with a flat end designed to compress rather than penetrate the track below it. However, the notion that the compression spikes have less track penetration is not supported by scientific studies. Lastly, there are Tartan spikes that are dull that are most commonly used for rubber tracks.

See also 

 Racing flats
 Cleat (shoe)
 Comparison of orthotics
Starting blocks

References

Athletic shoes
Sport of athletics equipment
Sport of athletics terminology
English inventions